Hermann-Leopold Ammende (1 November 1855 Pärnu – 26 August 1934 Pärnu) was an Estonian politician. He was a member of I Riigikogu. On 4 January 1921, he resigned his position and he was replaced by Walter von Pezold.

References

1855 births
1934 deaths
Politicians from Pärnu
People from Kreis Pernau
Baltic-German people
German-Baltic Party politicians
Members of the Riigikogu, 1920–1923